The following lists events that happened during 1986 in New Zealand.

Population
 Estimated population as of 31 December: 3,313,500
 Increase since 31 December 1985: 10,400 (0.31%)
 Males per 100 Females: 97.9

Incumbents

Regal and viceregal
 Head of State – Elizabeth II
 Governor-General – The Rt Revd. Sir Paul Reeves GCMG GCVO QSO

Government
The 41st New Zealand Parliament continued. The fourth Labour Party government was in power.
 Speaker of the House – Gerard Wall
 Prime Minister – David Lange
 Deputy Prime Minister – Geoffrey Palmer
 Minister of Finance – Roger Douglas
 Minister of Foreign Affairs – David Lange
 Chief Justice – Sir Ronald Davison

Parliamentary opposition 
 Leader of the Opposition – Jim McLay (National) until 26 March, then Jim Bolger (National).

Main centre leaders
 Mayor of Auckland – Catherine Tizard
 Mayor of Hamilton – Ross Jansen
 Mayor of Wellington – Ian Lawrence then Jim Belich
 Mayor of Christchurch – Hamish Hay
 Mayor of Dunedin – Cliff Skeggs

Events 
 16 February – Mikhail Lermontov sinks in the Marlborough Sounds.
 26 March – Jim Bolger replaces Jim McLay as leader of the National Party.
 21 June – The Wanganui Herald publishes its last issue. The paper started in 1865 as The Evening Herald.
 9 July – Parliament passes the Homosexual Law Reform Bill, 49 votes to 44; the law comes into effect on 8 August.
 1 October – GST is introduced at a rate of 10%.
 22 November – Pope John Paul II visits New Zealand for two days.
 December – The Royal Commission on the Electoral System produces a report recommending the adoption of a mixed member proportional electoral system.
 13 December – The Constitution Act is passed, ending the right of the British Parliament to pass laws on behalf of New Zealand.
 16 December – Māori loan affair raised by Winston Peters in Parliament.

Arts and literature
 Cilla McQueen wins the Robert Burns Fellowship.

See 1986 in art, 1986 in literature, :Category:1986 books

Music

New Zealand Music Awards
Winners are shown first with nominees underneath.
 ALBUM OF THE YEAR Peking Man – Peking Man
The Verlaines – Halleujah
Patsy Riggir – Patsy Riggir Country
 SINGLE OF THE YEAR Peking Man – "Room That Echoes"
Ardijah – Give Me Your Number
Patea Maori Club featuring Dalvanius – E Papa
 BEST MALE VOCALIST Pat Urlich
Malcolm McNeill
Sonny Day
 BEST FEMALE VOCALIST Margaret Urlich
Betty Monga
Annie Crummer
 BEST GROUP Peking Man
The Patea Maori Group
Satellite Spies
 MOST PROMISING MALE VOCALIST Tex Pistol
Simon Alexandra
Lyonel Grant
 MOST PROMISING FEMALE VOCALIST Tania Rowles
Ainsley Day
Liz Diamond
 MOST PROMISING GROUP Ardijah
Chrome Safari
Wentworth Brewster & Co
 INTERNATIONAL ACHIEVEMENT Herbs
The Chills
Michael Roy Croft
 BEST VIDEO Kerry Brown – As The Sun Goes Down (Everything that Flies)
Stuart Dryborough – Good Luck To You
Fetus Productions/MEC – Flicker
 BEST PRODUCER Bruce Lynch – Peking Man
Ryan Monga/ Dave McArtney/ Trevor Reekie – Give Me Your Number (Ardijah)
Glyn Tucker – I Wish I'd Asked – (Satellite Spies)
 BEST ENGINEER Graeme Myhre – Peking Man
Ian Morris – Ballad of Buskin Bob
Paul Streekstra/Graham Myhre – Give Me Your Number
Graham Myhre – Drive Baby Drive
 BEST JAZZ ALBUM Phil Broadhurst Trio–Iris
John Niland – Inside
Alan Broadbent Trio – Further Down The Road
 BEST CLASSICAL ALBUM NZ Symphony Orchestra – A Song of Islands
Besser & Prosser – Dark Wind/Spring Rain
Eugene & Nicolai Albulescu – Rhapsody
Mina Foley / Michael Gifford – Mina Foley / Michael Gifford
 BEST COUNTRY ALBUM Patsy Riggir – Patsy Riggir Country
Suzanne Prentice – In Concert
Michael Roy Croft – Slow Burnin'
 BEST FOLK ALBUM Various Artists – Send The Boats Away
Chris and Lyn Thompson – Together
Boys of Spirit NZ Trust – Sea Shanties
 BEST GOSPEL ALBUM Samoan Congregational Christian Church Choir – Matou Te Fia Sauna
Paul and Colleen Trenwith and Friends – Brand New Day
Ray Watson – Asaph -Throne of Love
 BEST POLYNESIAN ALBUM The Five Stars – Flower of Samoa
O Savali A Keriso – E Le Mavae Le Alofa
Mahia Blackmore – Little Tui
 BEST SONG OF THE YEAR Dave Dobbyn – Slice of Heaven
Ryan Monga – Give Me Your Number
Dance Exponents – Caroline Skies
 BEST COVER Phil O'Reilly – Peking Man
Ngila Dickson – As the Sun Goes Down
Paula & Graham Reid – This Sporting Life

See: 1986 in music

Performing arts

 Benny Award presented by the Variety Artists Club of New Zealand to Johnny Bond.

Radio and television
 The State Owned Enterprises Act requires all State-owned enterprises, including Television New Zealand, to operate as commercially successful businesses.  

See: 1986 in New Zealand television, 1986 in television, List of TVNZ television programming, :Category:Television in New Zealand, TV3 (New Zealand), :Category:New Zealand television shows, Public broadcasting in New Zealand

Film
 Mark II
 Pallet on the Floor
 Queen City Rocker

See: :Category:1986 film awards, 1986 in film, List of New Zealand feature films, Cinema of New Zealand, :Category:1986 films

Sport

Athletics
 John Campbell wins his second national title in the men's marathon, clocking 2:15:19 on 1 June in Christchurch, while Sharon Higgins claims her first in the women's championship (2:45:44).

Commonwealth Games

Cricket
 New Zealand achieve historic test series wins over Australia and England.

Their 1–0 victory over Alan Border's Australians in February/March 1986 was their first series win over Australia at home with a 5 wicket win in the third test at Eden Park. This followed on from their 2-1 series win in Australia in November/December 1985, where Richard Hadlee took a record 33 wickets in three tests.

In June/July 1986 New Zealand achieved their first test series win in England, 1-0, winning the second test at Trent Bridge.

Horse racing

Harness racing
 New Zealand Trotting Cup: Master Mood
 Auckland Trotting Cup: Comedy Lad

Shooting
Ballinger Belt – 
Mark Buchanan (Australia)
Chester Burt (Ashhurst), second, top New Zealander

Soccer
 The Chatham Cup is won by North Shore United who beat Mount Maunganui 4–2 on aggregate in the two-legged final.

Births
 2 January: Nathan Cohen, rower, Olympic gold medallist (2012 London)
 15 January: Isaia Toeava, rugby player.
 29 January: Steven Broad, singer.
 13 February: Hamish Bond, rower, Olympic gold medallist (2012 London)
 17 February: Steven Old, soccer player.
 4 March: Manu Vatuvei, rugby league player.
 5 March: Sean Eathorne, cricketer.
 17 March (in South Africa): Corney Swanepoel, swimmer.
 4 April: Richard Petherick, field hockey player.
 20 April: Cameron Duncan, director and screenwriter (d. 2003)
 21 April (in Australia): Ryan Kersten, basketballer.
 5 May: Cole Tinkler, soccer player.
 6 May: Tanerau Latimer, rugby player
 15 May: Jo Aleh, sailor, Olympic gold medallist (2012 London)
 4 September: Michael Murphy, singer.
 16 September: Willie Lonsdale, cricketer.
 24 September: Todd Astle, cricketer.
 30 September: Martin Guptill, cricketer.
 7 October: Amy Satterthwaite, cricketer.
 14 October: Teresa Bergman, singer.
:Category:1986 births

Deaths
 25 January: Dennis Smith, cricketer.
 24 April: Garnet Mackley, businessman and politician.
 16 May: Joe Bootham, painter.
 19 May: Leonard Trent, RNZAF pilot and Victoria Cross winner.
 27 June: George Nēpia, rugby player.
 10 August: Don McRae, cricketer and soccer player. 
 11 August: Peter Mahon, Queen's Counsel, judge. 
 25 September: Geoff Alley, rugby player, National Librarian.

References

See also
 History of New Zealand
 List of years in New Zealand
 Military history of New Zealand
 Timeline of New Zealand history
 Timeline of New Zealand's links with Antarctica
 Timeline of the New Zealand environment

 
New Zealand
Years of the 20th century in New Zealand